Rob Curling (born 8 September 1957, in Kuala Lumpur, Malaya) is a British television presenter and journalist. He presents the sport for Sky News. He also fronts the tennis coverage for British Eurosport. Up to and including 2011, he anchored BBC Sport's interactive television coverage of: Olympic Games, Commonwealth Games, Wimbledon, Open Golf, Six Nations Rugby and World Athletics Championships. He was the host of the game show Turnabout, which aired on BBC One for eight series between 1990 and 1996. He presented the Halford Tour Series cycling for ITV4, and commentated on table tennis on the BBC at the 2010 Commonwealth Games in Delhi.

He has hosted podcasts for The Guardian, including the 2007 Cricket World Cup.

Curling appeared on the show Banzai and TV's 100 Funniest Moments for Channel 4, Sky One's Brainiac, The Basil Brush Show (BBC1), and Through the Keyhole (BBC1 & Sky). He also starred in the last series of Beadle's About.

He also appears in the cinema release Children of Men (Universal Pictures), starring Clive Owen and Michael Caine.

He appeared in the Netflix show The Crown Season 4, Episode 1, as the commentator at Princess Anne's circuit at Badminton Trials.

Podcasts

In addition to appearing on many tennis based podcasts as a guest, Rob hosts his own aviation podcast - Top Landing Gear - with Scouting for Girls frontman Roy Stride, Rob's brother Jeremy and Pilot James Cartner

Education
Curling was educated at the independent Cranleigh School in Cranleigh, Surrey.

Video narration
Curling has narrated a number of videos about railways, including:
 Bakerloo line and Waterloo & City line
 Jubilee line
 Circle line and Hammersmith & City line
 Northern line
 Piccadilly line
 East London line and District line
 Central line
 Victoria line
 Metropolitan line
 Hammersmith & City line and District line
 Reading to London Waterloo by South West Trains
 Thames Branches by First Great Western
 Devon Branches Exmouth to Barnstaple by First Great Western
 Devon Branches Plymouth to Gunnislake and Newton Abbot to Paignton by First Great Western
 Tyne Valley line, Carlisle to Newcastle by Northern Rail

Life and career
One of Curling's earliest jobs was in the BBC's Film Archive Library. His on-screen career began in 1987 as a newsreader and co-presenter of the BBC's regional news programme London Plus, later to become Newsroom South East. He was a member of the BAFTA-winning team for the BBC's series of outside broadcasts commemorating 50 years of the end of World War II: D-Day Remembered, VE-50 & VJ-50. He was also nominated for a BAFTA for BBC Education's current affairs series Issues & The Geography Programme.

Curling presents numerous programmes and videos on aviation, including a history of the Spitfire for ITV. He also narrates a series of Drivers' Eye View videos for Video 125 about the London Underground, Reading to Waterloo, Thames Branchlines and Devon Branchlines. As well as a broadcaster, Curling is a conference and awards host, after dinner speaker and media trainer.

External links

 

1957 births
Living people
Sky Sports presenters and reporters
People educated at Cranleigh School